Derby City Council is the local government unitary authority for Derby, a city in the East Midlands region of England. It comprises 51 councillors, three for each of the 17 electoral wards of Derby. Currently there is no overall control of the council, with the Conservative Party being the biggest party. Paul Simpson became Chief Executive in March 2020.

As a unitary authority, Derby City Council is responsible for all services within its boundary and is therefore distinct from the two-tier system of local government that exists in the surrounding county of Derbyshire. Outside the city, responsibility is shared between Derbyshire County Council and various district or borough councils, such as Derbyshire Dales, High Peak, Erewash and Chesterfield.

Political makeup

Derby City Council has 51 councillors, with three councillors representing each of the seventeen wards within the city. Up until the 2022 elections it elected councillors 'by thirds', meaning that one third of the councillors (one per ward) were elected at each local election for a four-year period. From 2023 the city will elect its councillors in all out elections which will be based on new ward boundaries.

Following the 2022 elections the political composition is:

 18 Conservative
 16 Labour
 8 Liberal Democrat
 6 Reform Derby
 3 Independent

Wards

Arms

References

External links
Derby Telegraph – Derby City Council in running for Council of the Year
BBC News – Labour wins control of Derby City Council

Local authorities in Derbyshire
Politics of Derby
Unitary authority councils of England
Local education authorities in England
Billing authorities in England
Leader and cabinet executives